Waterworld is a pinball machine designed by Ray Tanzer and Jon Norris and released by Gottlieb in October 1995. It is based on the film of the same name.

References

External links
Internet Pinball Database entry for Waterworld

1995 pinball machines
Pinball machines based on films
Gottlieb pinball machines